The 1974 Ole Miss Rebels football team represented the University of Mississippi (Ole Miss) in the 1974 NCAA Division I football season. The Rebels were led by first-year head coach Ken Cooper and played their home games at Hemingway Stadium in Oxford, Mississippi and Mississippi Veterans Memorial Stadium in Jackson. The team competed as a member of the Southeastern Conference, finishing in last. The Rebels opened the season with an upset of Missouri, but the rest of the season went very poorly, as the team went winless in conference play and finished with a record of 3–8, the school's first losing season since 1949.

Schedule

References

Ole Miss
Ole Miss Rebels football seasons
Ole Miss Rebels football